Mina Fonda Ochtman (1862–1924) was an American Impressionist painter noted for her watercolors of landscapes and coastal scenes. She was wife of the artist Leonard Ochtman, and an active member of the Cos Cob Art Colony in Greenwich, Connecticut the early 20th century.

Life and career 
Mina Fonda was born in Laconia, New Hampshire in 1862.   In 1886 she went to New York City to study at the Art Students League of New York with Kenyon Cox.

She married Leonard Ochtman in 1891.  They settled in Cos Cob and established a summer art school in 1910.  Leonard served as the founder and first vice president of the Greenwich Society of Artists in 1912, and served as its president from 1919 to 1932.

The forested home that Leonard and Mina shared was known as "Greyledge," and served as a center of attraction for local artists.  Their home and the landscapes which surrounded it are featured in many of their works.  They had two children, Dorothy Ochtman Del Mar, who was also an artist, and Leonard Ochtman Jr.

Mina Ochtman was a member of the National Association of Women Artists as well as several watercolor societies.

She died in 1924.

Further reading 
Larkin, Susan G. 1989. The Ochtmans of Cos Cob: Leonard Ochtman (1854-1934), Mina Fonda Ochtman (1862-1924), Dorothy Ochtman (1892-1971), Leonard Ochtman, Jr. (1894-1976). Greenwich, Conn: Bruce Museum.

References

External links 
 Mina Fonda Ochtman in the Smithsonian Collections Search Center

1862 births
1924 deaths
American women painters
19th-century American painters
20th-century American painters
19th-century American women artists
20th-century American women artists
Art Students League of New York alumni
National Association of Women Artists members
People from Laconia, New Hampshire
Painters from New Hampshire